Creep 2 is a 2017 American found footage psychological horror film directed by Patrick Brice and written by Brice and Mark Duplass. It is a sequel to Brice's 2014 film Creep, which was also written by Duplass and Brice. Duplass reprises his role from the first film as a serial killer who lures unsuspecting videographers to their deaths, with Desiree Akhavan portraying his latest target.

The film had its world premiere at the Sitges Film Festival on October 6, 2017, and was released on October 24, 2017, by The Orchard. Like its predecessor, Creep 2 was also critically acclaimed, with much praise focused on the film's writing, atmosphere, dark humor, and the performances among the leads.

Brice confirmed that a third film was in development.

Plot 
A prolific serial killer, using the name "Aaron" after a previous victim, finds himself dissatisfied with his killings and undergoing a midlife crisis. When his latest ad for a videographer lures YouTuber Sara to his remote cabin, Aaron changes his approach by admitting he is a serial killer who will let Sara live for the next 24 hours if she records a documentary on his life. Sara, doubting his revelation, agrees to film Aaron in the hope that the video will popularize her unsuccessful web series about eccentric Craigslist clients.

Over the course of the day, Aaron struggles to intimidate Sara, who plays along with his various eccentricities. While Sara continues to doubt that Aaron is a serial killer, Aaron informs her that he intends to conclude the documentary by having her kill him. He eventually manages to horrify Sara by staging a suicide attempt, which almost causes her to leave. However, after Aaron reveals that his life was not in danger, she remains to hear Aaron share intimate details about himself, culminating in the two sharing a kiss.

Aaron brings Sara outside to announce that the documentary will end with them committing suicide together. Sara attempts to escape when she sees Aaron stab himself in the stomach, but Aaron stabs her and drags her into an open grave he dug. As Aaron gives a closing monologue, a still-alive Sara emerges from the grave and strikes him in the back of the head with a shovel before fleeing.

Afterwards, Sara is recorded in public by an unidentified individual whistling a tune heard in Aaron's videos. When Sara notices the individual filming her, the camera abruptly cuts away.

Cast 
 Mark Duplass as Aaron
 Desiree Akhavan as Sara
 Karan Soni as Dave

Additionally, Kyle Field, Caveh Zahedi, and Jeff Man portray Wade, Randy, and Alex, subjects featured in Sara's web series. Director Patrick Brice reappears in his role as Aaron (referred to in the credits as "Old Aaron") through archive footage from the first film.

Production 
In March 2014, it was announced Duplass had plans on making the film into a trilogy, with RADiUS-TWC producing and distributing the films and production taking place later in the year. In February 2015, Duplass stated production hadn't begun due to scheduling issues. In August 2016, Duplass began trying on costumes for the film. That same month, Brice confirmed the sequel was moving forward.

Filming
Principal photography on the film began in September 2016.

Music 
Julian Wass composed the soundtrack for Creep 2. The song that plays in the end credits is "Botanica de Los Angeles" by Xiu Xiu, taken from their album Angel Guts: Red Classroom.

Release
It had its world premiere at the Sitges Film Festival on October 6, 2017. The film was released through video on demand on October 24, 2017. It was released through Netflix on December 23, 2017.

Critical reception 
On review aggregator website Rotten Tomatoes, the film has an approval rating of 100% based on 26 reviews, with an average rating of 7.6/10. The site's consensus reads, "Creep 2 has everything that made the original work and more - more laughs, more awkwardness, more unsettling terror." On Metacritic, the film has a score of 75 out of 100, based on reviews from 5 critics, indicating "generally favorable reviews".

John DeFore of The Hollywood Reporter wrote: "The sequel will impress any fan of the original. It's fresher than most of the low-budget thrillers gracing theaters lately." Kimberley Elizabeth of Nightmare on Film Street called the film "hypnotically unsettling", giving the film a 4 out of 4 rating. Mike Sprague of JoBlo.com said the film was "just as unsettling and entertaining as the original" and awarded it an 8 out of 10 rating.

Sequel 
In 2017, Brice confirmed that a third film, titled Creep 3, was in development, with Brice and Duplass returning as director and star respectively.

Notes

References

External links 
 

2017 films
2017 horror films
2017 horror thriller films
American sequel films
American psychological horror films
American psychological thriller films
American horror thriller films
Blumhouse Productions films
Films directed by Patrick Brice
Films produced by Jason Blum
Found footage films
2010s American films
2010s English-language films